Garvan McCarthy (born 3 September 1980) is an Irish former hurler. At club level he played with Sarsfields and was also a member of the Cork senior hurling team. He usually lined out as a forward.

Career

McCarthy first came to prominence at juvenile and underage levels with the Sarsfields club before eventually joining the club's senior team. He was a member of the club's extended panel when Sarsfields won County Senior Championship titles in 2008 and 2010. McCarthy first appeared on the inter-county scene as part of the Cork team that won the All-Ireland Minor Championship title in 1998. He was drafted onto the Cork senior hurling team in 2004 and was a non-playing substitute when Cork beat Kilkenny in the 2004 All-Ireland final. McCarthy was released from the panel during the 2005 season.

Career statistics

Honours

Sarsfields
Cork Senior Hurling Championship: 2008, 2010

Cork
All-Ireland Senior Hurling Championship: 2004
All-Ireland Minor Hurling Championship: 1998
Munster Minor Hurling Championship: 1998

References

1978 births
Living people
Sarsfields (Cork) hurlers
Cork inter-county hurlers
Irish carpenters